Kempe may refer to:

 Kempe baronets,  a title in the Baronetage of England
 Kempe chain, part of the four-colour theorem
 Kempe Fjord, King Christian X Land, Greenland
 Kempe Glacier, Antarctica
 Kempe Hill, former name of Camp Hill, West Midlands, England

People with the surname 
 Adrian Kempe (born 1996), Swedish ice hockey player
 Alfred Kempe (1849–1922), English mathematician
 Arnold E. Kempe (born 1927), American lawyer and politician
 Carl Kempe (1884–1967), Swedish paper producer
 Charles Eamer Kempe (1837–1907), English stained glass designer
 C. Henry Kempe (1922–1984), American pediatrician who identified the Battered child syndrome
 Kempe Gowda I (1513–69), Yelahanka chieftain, founded the city of Bangalore
 Margery Kempe (c. 1373–after 1438), English autobiographer, religious pilgrim
 Raymond J. Kempe (born 1931), American lawyer and politician
 Rudolf Kempe (1910–76), German conductor
 William Kempe (died c. 1603), English actor and morris dancer

See also 
 Kemp (disambiguation)